Yasser Baldé (born 12 January 1993) is a French professional footballer who plays as a centre-back for Laval.

Career
A youth product of the youth academy of Fréjus Saint-Raphaël and Auxerre, Baldé began his senior career with Auxerre's reserves in 2012 before returning to Fréjus Saint-Raphaël in 2015. He had a stint with Marseille Endoume in 2018. In 2019 he moved to Sedan, before signing a contract with Cholet on 28 June 2020. On 20 May 2021 he signed with Laval, becoming their first recruit in the 2021-22 season. He helped Laval win the 2021–22 Championnat National and achieved promotion into the Ligue 2 for the 2022-23 season.

Personal life
Baldé was born in France to a Guinean father and Moroccan mother. He is the half-brother of the Guinea international footballer Bobo Baldé.

Honours
Laval
Championnat National: 2021–22

References

External links
 

1993 births
Living people
Sportspeople from Var (department)
French footballers
French sportspeople of Guinean descent
French sportspeople of Moroccan descent
ÉFC Fréjus Saint-Raphaël players
US Marseille Endoume players
CS Sedan Ardennes players
SO Cholet players
Stade Lavallois players
Ligue 2 players
Championnat National players
Championnat National 2 players
Championnat National 3 players
Association football defenders